The 1999–2000 NBA season was the 54th season of the National Basketball Association. The season ended with the Los Angeles Lakers winning the NBA championship, beating the Indiana Pacers 4 games to 2 in the 2000 NBA Finals. This would also be Charles Barkley’s final season in the NBA.

Notable occurrences

Effective this season, the first game of the NBA regular season begins on either the first Tuesday of November or the last Tuesday of October, and the last game on the third Wednesday of April. The NBA playoffs begin on the third Saturday of April.
The 2000 NBA All-Star Game was held in Oakland, California. The West won 137–126. Tim Duncan from the San Antonio Spurs and Shaquille O'Neal from the Los Angeles Lakers shared the game's MVP honors. The Slam Dunk Contest returned after a two-year absence, with Vince Carter winning the title in what is considered to be the best Dunk Contest performance of all time.
Both the Los Angeles Lakers and the Los Angeles Clippers played their first games at Staples Center (now Crypto.com Arena). The Lakers would also go on to win 19 consecutive games between February 4, 2000, and March 16, 2000, the sixth-longest winning streak in NBA history.
Staples Center's first season saw its tenants at two opposite ends of the league: the Lakers finished with a best regular season record of 67–15 and the NBA title, while the Clippers finished 15–67, the worst of the season.
The Denver Nuggets played their first season at Pepsi Center (now Ball Arena).
The Indiana Pacers played their first season at Conseco Fieldhouse (now Gainbridge Fieldhouse).
The Indiana Pacers advanced to the NBA Finals for the first time in franchise history.
The Atlanta Hawks played their first season at Philips Arena (now State Farm Arena).
The Miami Heat started the season playing their home games at Miami Arena. In January, they played their first game at the American Airlines Arena (now Miami-Dade Arena).
The Toronto Raptors played their first full season at Air Canada Centre (now Scotiabank Arena). They also made the playoffs for the first time, becoming the first Canadian team to do so.
During Game 7 of the Western Conference Finals, the Portland Trail Blazers held a 75–60 lead over the Los Angeles Lakers with 10:28 left to play. During the fourth quarter, the Blazers would miss thirteen consecutive shots, allowing the Lakers to claw back and take the game, 89–84. The game was capped off with a famous alley-oop to Shaquille O'Neal from Kobe Bryant.
Two active players were killed in automobile accidents within four months of each other. On January 12, Bobby Phills of the Charlotte Hornets was killed as a result of reckless driving while racing against teammate David Wesley. On May 20, Malik Sealy of the Minnesota Timberwolves was driving home from a birthday party being held for Kevin Garnett when his SUV was struck by a drunk driver who had been driving on the wrong side of the road. Phills would have his jersey retired during the season after news of his unexpected death was announced, while Sealy would have his jersey retired after this season concluded.
San Antonio Spurs forward Sean Elliott was sidelined for most of the season while undergoing kidney transplant operations. He successfully returned on March 13, becoming the first player to return following kidney transplant.
The Boston Celtics officially retired their trademark parquet floor on December 22, 1999, after 54 years. The floor would be replaced by a replica combining elements of the old floor and new wooden sections.
Doc Rivers became the first recipient of the NBA Coach of the Year Award to have not led his team to the playoffs. He coached the Orlando Magic to a respectable 41–41 (.500) record, good enough for the 9th seed in the East.
The season marked Patrick Ewing's last in a New York Knicks uniform. He was traded during the 2000 offseason to the Seattle SuperSonics in a four-team deal.
Hall of Famer Wilt Chamberlain died on October 12, 1999, at 63. Wilt's former teams, the Lakers, Sixers, and Warriors honored him by sporting black patches for the rest of the season.
Kevin Johnson returned from retirement to replace the injured Jason Kidd of  Phoenix Suns in this season's playoffs, but the Suns fell to the Lakers in the second round and Johnson would retire again.
36-year-old Houston Rockets forward Charles Barkley suffered a devastating injury early in the season but returned for a final game before retiring.

1999–2000 NBA changes
 The Atlanta Hawks moved into the Philips Arena and changed their uniforms added white (road), and red (home) side panels to their jerseys and shorts.
 The Cleveland Cavaliers changed their uniforms, removing the blue areas from their jerseys.
 The Denver Nuggets moved into the Pepsi Center.
 The Detroit Pistons added new maroon alternate uniforms added black side panels to their jerseys and shorts.
 The Indiana Pacers moved into Conseco Fieldhouse, now Gainbridge Fieldhouse.
 The Los Angeles Clippers and Los Angeles Lakers both moved into the Staples Center, now Crypto.com Arena, while the Lakers changed their uniforms added gold (road), and purple (home) side panels to their jerseys and shorts.
 The Miami Heat changed their logo and uniforms added dark red (road), and also dark red (home) side panels to their jerseys and shorts, and moved into the AmericanAirlines Arena in January 2000 (now Miami-Dade Arena).
 The Philadelphia 76ers added new blue alternate uniforms.
 The Seattle SuperSonics added new red alternate uniforms added dark green side panels to their jerseys and shorts.
 The Toronto Raptors changed their uniforms removing the pinstripes added side panels to their jerseys and shorts.

Final standings

By division

Eastern Conference

Western Conference

By conference

Notes
z – Clinched home court advantage for the entire playoffs
c – Clinched home court advantage for the conference playoffs
y – Clinched division title 
x – Clinched playoff spot

Playoffs
Teams in bold advanced to the next round. The numbers to the left of each team indicate the team's seeding in its conference, and the numbers to the right indicate the number of games the team won in that round. The division champions are marked by an asterisk. Home court advantage does not necessarily belong to the higher-seeded team, but instead the team with the better regular season record; teams enjoying the home advantage are shown in italics.

Statistics leaders

NBA awards
Most Valuable Player: Shaquille O'Neal, Los Angeles Lakers
Co-Rookies of the Year: Elton Brand, Chicago Bulls; Steve Francis, Houston Rockets
Defensive Player of the Year: Alonzo Mourning, Miami Heat
Sixth Man of the Year: Rodney Rogers, Phoenix Suns
Most Improved Player: Jalen Rose, Indiana Pacers
Coach of the Year: Doc Rivers, Orlando Magic
Executive of the Year: John Gabriel, Orlando Magic
Sportsmanship Award: Eric Snow, Philadelphia 76ers

All-NBA First Team:
F – Tim Duncan, San Antonio Spurs
F – Kevin Garnett, Minnesota Timberwolves
C – Shaquille O'Neal, Los Angeles Lakers
G – Gary Payton, Seattle SuperSonics
G – Jason Kidd, Phoenix Suns

All-NBA Second Team:
F – Karl Malone, Utah Jazz
F – Grant Hill, Detroit Pistons
C – Alonzo Mourning, Miami Heat
G – Allen Iverson, Philadelphia 76ers
G – Kobe Bryant, Los Angeles Lakers

All-NBA Third Team:
F – Chris Webber, Sacramento Kings
F – Vince Carter, Toronto Raptors
C – David Robinson, San Antonio Spurs
G – Eddie Jones, Charlotte Hornets
G – Stephon Marbury, New Jersey Nets

NBA All-Defensive First Team:
Tim Duncan, San Antonio Spurs
Kevin Garnett, Minnesota Timberwolves
Alonzo Mourning, Miami Heat
Gary Payton, Seattle SuperSonics
Kobe Bryant, Los Angeles Lakers

All-Defensive Second Team:
Scottie Pippen, Portland Trail Blazers
Clifford Robinson, Phoenix Suns
Shaquille O'Neal, Los Angeles Lakers
Eddie Jones, Charlotte Hornets
Jason Kidd, Phoenix Suns

NBA All-Rookie First Team:
Elton Brand, Chicago Bulls
Steve Francis, Houston Rockets
Lamar Odom, Los Angeles Clippers
Wally Szczerbiak, Minnesota Timberwolves
Andre Miller, Cleveland Cavaliers

All-Rookie Second Team:
Shawn Marion, Phoenix Suns
Ron Artest, Chicago Bulls
James Posey, Denver Nuggets
Jason Terry, Atlanta Hawks
Chucky Atkins, Orlando Magic

Players of the month
The following players were named the Players of the Month.

Rookies of the month
The following players were named the Rookies of the Month.

Coaches of the month
The following coaches were named Coaches of the Month.

Notes

References

 
NBA
1999–2000 in Canadian basketball